Stewart B. Brown (died December 22, 1973) was an American politician from Maine. Brown, a Republican, served as Mayor of South Portland in 1957. He also served two terms (1961-1964) in the Maine House of Representatives.

References

Year of birth missing
1973 deaths
Mayors of South Portland, Maine
Republican Party members of the Maine House of Representatives
20th-century American politicians